Fredericton-Lincoln was a provincial electoral district for the Legislative Assembly of New Brunswick, Canada.  It was first created in the 2006 redrawing of electoral districts and was first used in the general election later that year. Its last MLA was Craig Leonard who served in the cabinet as Minister of Government Services.

History 

The district was created in the 2006 redistribution primarily from those parts of Fredericton-Fort Nashwaak south of the Saint John River and the suburban community of Lincoln from the New Maryland district. It also includes those portions of downtown Fredericton east of Regent Street that were not already a part of Fredericton-Fort Nashwaak (including the legislature building itself) which were formerly part of Fredericton South.

Its first representative is Liberal Greg Byrne, who previously represented the old Fredericton-Fort Nashwaak district from 1995 to 1999.  One of Byrne's challengers in 2006 was then leader of the New Brunswick New Democratic Party Allison Brewer.

Members of the Legislative Assembly

Election results 

* This was a new district being contested for the first time, being made up in parts from the former districts of Fredericton-Fort Nashwaak, Fredericton South and New Maryland. The latter two were previously held by the Progressive Conservatives while Fredericton-Fort Nashwaak had been held by the Liberals.

See also 
 New Brunswick electoral redistribution, 2006

References 

 "An Electoral Map for New Brunswick: Final Report of the Electoral Boundaries and Representation Commission"
 Office of the Chief Electoral Officer.  "2006 Provincial Election Results"

External links 
Website of the Legislative Assembly of New Brunswick

Former provincial electoral districts of New Brunswick
Politics of Fredericton